Lucio Battisti vol. 4 is an album by the Italian singer-songwriter Lucio Battisti. It was released on 21 October 1971 by Dischi Ricordi.

The album was Italy's 19th best selling album in 1972.

Track listing 
All lyrics written by Mogol, except where noted, all music composed by Lucio Battisti, except where noted.
 "Le tre verità" (The Three Truths) – 4:55
 "Dio mio no" (My God, No!) – 7:32
 "Adesso sì" (Now Yes) (Lyrics and music by Sergio Endrigo) – 3:15
 "La mia canzone per Maria" (My Song for Maria) – 3:13
 "Luisa Rossi" – 2:48
 "Pensieri e parole" (Thoughts and Words) – 3:55
 "Mi ritorni in mente" (Wake Me I Am Dreaming) – 3:43
 "Insieme a te sto bene" (Together with You I Feel Good) – 3:48
 "29 settembre" (29th September) – 3:34
 "Io vivrò (senza te)" (I Will Live (Without You)) – 4:02

Charts

References

1971 albums
Lucio Battisti albums